This is a list of seasons played by Middlesbrough Women Football Club. The list currently covers the period from 1998, the inaugural season of the Northern Combination, to the most recent completed season.

Key

Key to league competitions:

 FA Women's Premier League Northern Division (Premier League Northern) – The second tier of English women's football until 2011, when it became the third tier.
 Northern Combination Women's Football League (Northern Combination) – The third tier of English women's football until 2011, when it became the fourth tier.
 FA Women's National League Northern Premier Division (Northern Premier Division) – The third tier of English women's football.
 FA Women's National League Northern Division One (Northern Division One) – The fourth tier of English women's football.

Cup Results
DR = Determining round
PR = Preliminary round
Q1 = Qualifying round 1
Q2 = Qualifying round 2, etc.
R1 = Round 1
R2 = Round 2, etc.

Cup Results (cont.)
QF = Quarter-finals 
SF = Semi-finals
RU = Runners-up
WN = Winners
GS = Group Stage
L16 = Last 16

Seasons

Notes

References

Middlesbrough W.F.C.
Middlesbrough W.F.C.